Chromodoris aila is a species of colourful sea slug, a dorid nudibranch, a marine gastropod mollusk in the family Chromodorididae.

Distribution 
This species was described from Beaufort, North Carolina, United States. It has not been reported since.

Description
Chromodoris aila is most likely to be a species of Felimare as Marcus describes it as similar to Chromodoris moerchii.

Ecology

References

Chromodorididae
Gastropods described in 1961